Excited delirium (ExDS), also known as agitated delirium (AgDS), is a controversial diagnosis sometimes characterized as a potentially fatal state of extreme agitation and delirium. It is typically diagnosed postmortem in young adult males, disproportionally black men, who were physically restrained at the time of death, most often by law enforcement personnel.
Symptoms are said to include aggressive behavior, extreme physical strength and hyperthermia. It is not listed in the Diagnostic and Statistical Manual of Mental Disorders or the International Classification of Diseases, and is not recognized by the World Health Organization, the American Psychiatric Association, the American Medical Association, or the American Academy of Emergency Medicine. It is accepted primarily by the American College of Emergency Physicians.

Excited delirium is particularly associated with taser use. A 2017 investigative report by Reuters found that excited delirium had been listed as a factor in autopsy reports, court records or other sources in at least 276 deaths that followed taser use since 2000.  Manufactured by the firm Axon, the makers have been involved in police training in its use, publishing of numerous medical studies which promote their product, and other promotional activities.

There have also been concerns raised over the use of sedative drugs during an arrest following claims of excited delirium.  The drugs ketamine or midazolam (a benzodiazepine) and haloperidol injected into a muscle (an antipsychotic) have sometimes been used to sedate a person at the discretion of paramedics and sometimes at direct police request. Ketamine can cause respiratory arrest, and in many cases there is no evidence of a medical condition that would justify its use. The term excited delirium is sometimes used interchangeably with acute behavioural disturbance, a symptom of a number of conditions which is also responded to with involuntary injection with benzodiazapines, antipsychotics, or ketamine.

A 2020 investigation by the United Kingdom's forensic science regulator found that the diagnosis should not have been used since it "has been applied in some cases where other important pathological mechanisms, such as positional asphyxia and trauma may have been more appropriate". In the U.S., a diverse group of neurologists writing for the Brookings Institution called it "a misappropriation of medical terminology, used by law enforcement to legitimize police brutality and to retroactively explain certain deaths occurring in police custody". The American Psychiatric Association's position is that the term "is too non-specific to meaningfully describe and convey information about a person."

History 
Throughout the 19th and early-20th century, "excited delirium" was used to describe an emotional and agitated state related to drug overdose and withdrawal or poisonings, similar to catatonia or Bell's mania with some believing them to be the same condition. The term "excited delirium" (ExDS) began to be used as a diagnosis to explain deaths in police custody especially during or after restraint use in Miami, Florida in the 1980s; as used in a 1985 Journal of Forensic Sciences article, co-authored by deputy chief medical examiner for Dade County, Florida, Charles Victor Wetli (1943—2020), entitled Cocaine-induced psychosis and sudden death in recreational cocaine users. The JFS article reported that in "five of the seven" cases they studied, deaths occurred while in police custody. Wetli determined that nineteen women, all Black prostitutes, had died of the condition due to "sexual excitement" while under the influence of cocaine.  In 1992, police announced they had found a serial killer responsible for deaths determined by Wetli to be excited delirium. The legitimacy of the condition has since been under controversy with most  of the medical community not recognizing it, and there is no official entry for it in the official Diagnostic and Statistical Manual of Medical Disorders.

The supposed risk factors vary including "bizarre behavior generating phone calls to police", "failure to respond to police presence", and "continued struggle despite restraint". It supposedly endows individuals with "superhuman strength" and being "impervious to pain". It is disproportionately diagnosed among young Black males, and has clear undertones of racial bias.

In 1849, a superficially similar condition was described by Luther Bell as "Bell's mania". Bell was one of thirteen other mental hospital superintendents who met in Philadelphia in 1844 to organize the Association of Medical Superintendents of American Institutions for the Insane (AMSAII), now the American Psychiatric Association.

Incidence 
People diagnosed with excited delirium are frequently claimed to have acute drug intoxication, generally involving phencyclidine, prolintanone, methylenedioxypyrovalerone, cocaine, or methamphetamine. Multiple other factors may be in evidence.  These may include positional asphyxia, hyperthermia, drug toxicity, and/or catecholamine-induced fatal abnormal heart rhythms.

Other conditions which can resemble excited delirium  are mania, neuroleptic malignant syndrome, serotonin syndrome, thyroid storm, and catatonia of the malignant or excited type.

Deaths 
A 2017 report by Reuters found that excited delirium had been listed as a factor in autopsy reports, court records or other sources in at least 276 deaths that followed taser use since 2000, with diagnosis often based on a test conducted by Deborah Mash, a paid consultant to Axon, manufacturers of the Taser. In one case within four hours of a man dying after being tasered, Axon had provided model press releases, instructions for gathering evidence of excited delirium, and advised that samples be sent to Mash. Amnesty International found that the syndrome was cited in 75 of the 330 deaths following police use of a taser on suspects between 2001 and 2008, and a Florida-based study found it was listed as a cause of death in over half of all deaths in police custody, though many Florida districts do not use it at all.

While diagnosis is habitually of men under police restraint, medical preconditions and symptoms attributed to the syndrome are far more varied.

Lack of acceptance by most medical associations 
Excited delirium is not recognized by the World Health Organization, the American Psychiatric Association, the American Medical Association, and not listed as a medical condition in the Diagnostic and Statistical Manual of Mental Disorders or International Classification of Diseases. Dr. Michael Baden, a specialist in investigating deaths in custody, describes excited delirium as "a boutique kind of diagnosis created, unfortunately, by many of my forensic pathology colleagues specifically for persons dying when being restrained by law enforcement". In June 2021, the Royal College of Psychiatrists in the UK released a statement that they do "not support the use of such terminology [as ExDS or AgDS], which has no empirical evidential basis" and said "the use of these terms is, in effect, racial discrimination".

A 2020 scientific literature review looked at reported cases of excited delirium and agitated delirium. The authors noted that most published current information has indicated that excited delirium-related deaths are due to an occult pathophysiologic process. A database of cases was created which included the use of force, drug intoxication, mental illness, demographics, and survival outcome. A review of cases revealed there was no evidence to support ExDS as a cause of death in the absence of restraint. The authors found that when death occurred in an aggressively restrained individual that fits the profile of either ExDS or AgDS, restraint-related asphyxia must be considered the more likely cause of the death.

Position of the American College of Emergency Physicians

Following a 2009 review by an internal task force, the American College of Emergency Physicians accepted excited delirium as a "real and unique syndrome." Mark DeBard, a clinical professor of emergency medicine at Ohio State University College of Medicine who led the task force, commented, "Only two medical specialties interact with patients with this syndrome, the coroner and emergency physicians [and] only in the last two to three years have people outside of these become aware of the syndrome." 
At that time their list of symptoms describing the condition stated:

Commenting on ACEP's position, in a 2020 position paper the American Psychiatric Association stated:

Three of the members of ACEP's task force were linked to Axon, the corporation that manufactures Taser stun guns. Axon frequently blames excited delirium for stun-gun-related deaths.

Police involvement 
Males account for more documented diagnoses than females.  Often law enforcement has used tasers or physical measures in these cases, and death most frequently occurs after the person is forcefully restrained. Critics of excited delirium have stated that the condition is primarily attributed to deaths while in the custody of law enforcement and is disproportionately applied to Black and Hispanic victims. One study looking at cocaine-related deaths in the 1970s and 1980s in Florida, showed that the deaths were more likely to be diagnosed as excited delirium when involving young Black men dying in police custody and "accidental cocaine toxicity" when involving white people. A 1998 study found that "In all 21 cases of unexpected death associated with excited delirium, the deaths were associated with restraint (for violent agitation and hyperactivity), with the person either in a prone position (18 people [86%]) or subjected to pressure on the neck (3 [14%]). All of those who died had suddenly lapsed into tranquillity shortly after being restrained".

In 2003, the NAACP argued that excited delirium is used to explain the deaths of minorities more often than whites, and the American Psychiatric Association also notes that "the term excited delirium is disproportionately applied to Black men in police custody".  The American Civil Liberties Union argued in 2007 that the diagnosis served "as a means of white-washing what may be excessive use of force and inappropriate use of control techniques by officers during an arrest."

The UK Independent Advisory Panel on Deaths in Custody (IAP) suggests that the syndrome should be termed "Sudden death in restraint syndrome" in order to enhance clarity.  Some civil-rights groups have argued that excited delirium diagnoses are being used to absolve law enforcement of guilt in cases where alleged excessive force may have contributed to patient deaths.

Prominent cases include Daniel Prude, who was said to be in a state of excited delirium in 2020 when police put a hood over his head and pressed his naked body against the pavement. Prude, a Black man, lost consciousness and died. Excited delirium was also cited by the defense in State v. Chauvin, a murder trial related to the murder of George Floyd in 2020. Prosecutor Steve Schleicher refuted the defense suggestion that Floyd had "superhuman strength" during his arrest because he was suffering from the condition.

Ketamine 
Ketamine or midazolam and haloperidol injected into a muscle have frequently been used, sometimes at direct police request, to sedate the person. Ketamine can cause respiratory arrest, and in many cases there is no evidence of a medical condition that would justify its use.   Following an injection the person must be transported to a hospital.  In 2018 a Minneapolis hospital published a paper which reported that 57 percent of the people who had been injected for agitation needed intubation.

Concern has been raised about the increasing usage of a claim of excited delirium to justify tranquilizing persons during arrest, with requests for tranquilization often being made by law enforcement rather than medical professionals. Ketamine is the most commonly used drug in these cases. There have been deaths related to use of ketamine on restrained prisoners. A controversial study into ketamine use was terminated due to ethics concerns. The study was also linked to Axon via Jeffrey Ho.

In 2019 Elijah McClain, a Black man, was arrested by police officers after receiving a 911 call which reported a man walking, waving his arms and wearing a ski mask.  The officers said that he was exhibiting "crazy strength" when they attempted to arrest him but all three said that their body cams had fallen off and thus there was no video of what they claimed to be a violent struggle.  McClain weighed 140 pounds and was 5 feet 6 inches tall.  He was handcuffed and then a choke hold was used twice, once "successfully" meaning that McClain lost consciousness.  When paramedics arrived they administered enough ketamine to sedate a 220-pound man.  He went into cardiac arrest a few minutes later.  In a report of the case on 60 Minutes, John Dickerson interviewed the District Attorney who justified the use of ketamine, adding that since excited delirium could not be ruled out as a cause of death it would be impossible to win a homicide case because "you can't file a homicide charge without cause of death."

Taser use 
According to an article in the Harvard Civil Rights–Civil Liberties Law Review, since 2000, over one thousand people in the United States have died shortly after being tased, with the deaths sharing several commonalities: "the deceased often were mentally ill or under the influence of drugs at the time of death, they tend to have been shocked multiple times by officers during arrest, and they often share an exceptionally rare cause of death, 'excited delirium.'"

Axon Enterprise, formerly Taser International, provides training for police on recognizing excited delirium and several prominent proponents of the diagnosis are retained by Axon, with diagnosis often based on a test conducted by Deborah Mash, a paid consultant to Axon. In one case reported by an investigative report done by Reuters, within four hours of a man dying after being tasered Axon had provided model press releases, instructions for gathering evidence of excited delirium, and advised that samples be sent to Mash for lab work to establish a diagnosis.

Axon has paid thousands of dollars to proponents of the excited delirium diagnosis, including Charles Wetli who first proposed the term, who have repeatedly used "excited delirium" as a defense in liability suits and to shield police officers from criminal liability for deaths in custody. Harvard Civil Rights–Civil Liberties Law Review reports that "Axon has actively pursued litigation against some medical examiners who attribute deaths to tasers rather than excited delirium. These lawsuits seem to have a chilling effect on medical examiners' work; a 2011 survey found that 14% of medical examiners had modified a diagnostic finding out of fear of litigation by the company."

In Canada, the 2007 case of Robert Dziekanski received national attention and placed a spotlight on the use of tasers in police actions and the diagnosis of excited delirium. Police psychologist Mike Webster testified at a British Columbia inquiry into taser deaths that police have been "brainwashed" by Taser International to justify "ridiculously inappropriate" use of the electric weapon. He called excited delirium a "dubious disorder" used by Taser International in its training of police. In a 2008 report, the Royal Canadian Mounted Police argued that excited delirium should not be included in the operational manual for the Royal Canadian Mounted Police without formal approval after consultation with a mental-health-policy advisory body.

See also 
 Positional asphyxia
 Stimulant psychosis
 Taser safety issues
 List of diagnoses characterized as pseudoscience
 Police brutality

References 

1985 neologisms
Police brutality
Medical emergencies
Medical controversies in the United States
Wikipedia medicine articles ready to translate
Wikipedia emergency medicine articles ready to translate
Psychiatry controversies